Roy Rene (born Henry van der Sluys, 15 February 189122 November 1954) was an Australian comedian and vaudevillian. As the bawdy character Mo McCackie, Rene was one of the most well-known and successful Australian comedians of the 20th century.

A 1927 recording of Rene and Nat Phillips performing as Stiffy and Mo, called The Sailors, was added to the National Film and Sound Archive of Australia's Sounds of Australia registry in 2011.

Biography

Born in Adelaide, Colony of South Australia, Rene was the fourth of seven children of Dutch and English Jewish parents. Named Henry van de Sluice (later spelt variously "van der Sluys"), aged 10 "Harry" won a singing competition at an Adelaide market and in 1905 appeared professionally in the pantomime, Sinbad the Sailor, at the Theatre Royal and later at the Tivoli, in a black face, singing and dancing act.

Around 1905, the Sluice family moved to Melbourne, Harry (as he was called) was briefly an apprentice jockey and thereafter maintained a keen interest in racing. Despite his father's opposition, in July 1908, he secured an engagement with James Brennan's vaudeville at the Gaiety Theatre. Of medium height with a distinctly Jewish profile, with dark hair, a pale smooth complexion and large soulful brown eyes, 'Boy Roy' (his stage name) had an appealing pathos. Most of his spare time was spent studying the famous English music-hall comedians at Harry Rickards' Opera House. Unsuccessful in Melbourne, he appeared at Brennan's National Amphitheatre, Sydney in 1910 and had adopted the new stage name Roy Rene (Rene after a famous French clown). Later he joined J. C. Bain's suburban vaudeville in Sydney and toured New South Wales with bush companies.

Enter 'Mo'

While playing at Bain's Princess Theatre, Railway Square, Sydney, in 1914, Rene was noticed by producer Ben Fuller, who engaged him to tour New Zealand. He developed his unique style and perfected the black and white make-up which became his trademark. Returning to Sydney in November 1915, he joined Albert Bletsoe's revue company at the Fullers' National Theatre in Sydney. In July 1916, Rene ('Mo') teamed up with comedian Nat Phillips ('Stiffy'), and the duo became the famous Stiffy and Mo, renowned for their larrikin comedy. They opened at the Sydney Princess, were an instant success, and in December moved to the Grand Opera House, playing in the spectacular pantomime The Bunyip, followed by a season in Melbourne. On 29 March 1917 at St Stephen's Presbyterian Church, Sydney, Henry van der Sluice married an actress Dorothy Davis; childless, they were divorced in May 1929.

'Stiffy and Mo' played on the Fullers' circuit with enormous success until 1925 when, after a confrontation in Adelaide, they split up. Rene continued his tour at the Luxor, Perth, with a member of his company, Mike Connors, as his straight man.

In 1925–26, Rene appeared with outstanding success in a straight play, Give and Take, starring American comedian Harry Green, in Melbourne and Sydney. Back on the Tivoli circuit in May 1926, he was partnered by Fred Bluett in an act entitled 'The Admiral and the Sailor'. Fuller persuaded him to rejoin Phillips in 1927; once again 'Stiffy and Mo' broke box-office records, but the partnership finally broke up in New Zealand in 1928. Rene returned to Fuller's Theatre in Sydney with his own company, Mo and his Merrymakers. In Sydney on 3 July 1929 Rene married again, this time to Sadie Gale (1902–1997), a member of his company. Six months later he collapsed with peritonitis while appearing in Frank Neil's revue Clowns in Clover, in Melbourne and nearly died.
 
He returned to the theatre in mid-1930 for H. D. McIntosh in a revue, Pot Luck, at the Tivoli, Melbourne, but business was bad because of the Great Depression. Rene and Sadie resorted to a tour of Hoyts' suburban theatres in Sydney, followed by a brief vaudeville season in New Zealand, but the Fullers were disbanding their revue companies. In April 1931 Rene joined Connors and his wife Queenie Paul, who had successfully opened low-priced, weekly-change variety at the New Haymarket Theatre, Sydney. By 1932 the Connors had taken over the Melbourne Tivoli and converted the old Sydney Opera House to the new Tivoli, where Rene and Jim Gerald continued to appear after the Connors sold out in mid-1933. In 1934 he made his only film, Strike Me Lucky, for Ken G. Hall at Cinesound; however film was not his medium, as rapport with a live audience was essential to his comedy.

Early the next year, Rene played in Ernest C. Rolls's lavish revue, Rhapsodies of 1935, at the Apollo Theatre, Melbourne. In 1935–36, in partnership with Connors and Paul, he appeared in variety in Sydney and Melbourne, then returned to the Tivoli at the instigation of English producer Wallace Parnell. By early 1939 Rene was in conflict with Frank Neil, general manager of the Tivoli, who terminated his contract: on Neil's death in January 1941, Parnell immediately reinstated him. Throughout World War II Rene played to packed houses, but his contract was not renewed in 1945.

Radio days

Turning to radio in 1946, Rene signed a contract with Colgate-Palmolive Pty Ltd to appear in Calling the Stars with a live audience at the 2GB theatrette in Sydney; his much-acclaimed "McCackie Mansion" segment was a highlight. Living at 13 Coffin Street, "Mo" was the suburban householder whose life was made miserable by relatives, neighbours and friends. He later appeared in Cavalcade with Jack Davey, and as Professor McCackie in It Pays to be Ignorant.

Rene briefly returned to the stage in 1949 in the revue, McCackie Moments, at the Kings in Melbourne. By the time his radio contract expired in 1950 he was plagued by ill health, but he appeared once in McCackie Manor for the Australian Broadcasting Commission in 1951 and, in 1952, starred in The New Atlantic Show, again capturing a nationwide audience.

Survived by his wife, son and daughter, Rene died of atherosclerotic heart disease at his home at Kensington, New South Wales, on 22 November 1954, and was buried in the Jewish section of Rookwood Cemetery.

Although largely unknown overseas, "Mo" was hailed by visiting celebrities, such as Dame Sybil Thorndike and Jack Benny, as a comic genius in the company of Charlie Chaplin. Lecherous, leering and ribald, he epitomized the Australian "lair", always trying to "make a quid" or to "knock off a sheila", yet some of his funniest moments were when he was being "posh", as in his outrageous parody, with Sadie, of Noël Coward's Private Lives.

He was a Freemason.

Legacy and influence

The memory of Rene lives on in the Mo Awards, presented annually for excellence in live performance. The statuette presented to the recipients is in the form of Rene in his Mo McCackie persona.

Garry McDonald played Roy Rene/Mo in the 1977 theatre production Young Mo, written by Steve J. Spears, and on television in the 1980s.

See also
George Wallace (Australian comedian)

References

Sources

Parsons, Fred. A Man Called Mo. Melb: Heinemann, 1973.
Rene, Roy. Mo's Memoirs. (ghostwritten by Elizabeth Lambert and Max Harris) Melb: Reed and Harris, 1945.

Further reading

External links

"Performers: Roy Rene." Article published in the Laughterlog website. Includes extensive list of radio and film appearances. 
"Rene, Roy." Biography at AustLit: The Australian Literature Resource.
"Roy Rene." Biography at Live Performance Australia Hall of Fame.
"Roy Rene." Biography at the Australian Variety Theatre Archive.
"Roy Rene" at Ausstage.
 Sailors, The.. Sound Recording. This recording was added to the National Film and Sound Archive's Sounds of Australia registry in 2011.

1891 births
1954 deaths
Australian male comedians
Australian radio personalities
Australian Jews
Jewish Australian comedians
Australian people of Dutch-Jewish descent
Australian people of English-Jewish descent
Male actors from Adelaide
Australian male stage actors
20th-century Australian male actors
20th-century Australian comedians
Burials at Rookwood Cemetery